Samir Nassar (born 5 July 1950 in Nebay, Lebanon) is the current archeparch of the Maronite Catholic Archeparchy of Damascus.

Life

Samir Nassar received on August 17, 1980 the sacrament of Holy orders and was incardinated in the clergy of the Maronite Archeparchy of Damascus.

On 10 June 2006, he was elected bishop by the synod of the Maronite Church to the Archeparchy of Damascus. Pope Benedict XVI approved his election as archbishop of the Archeparchy of Damascus on 14 October 2006. Maronite Patriarch of Antioch, Nasrallah Boutros Sfeir, gave him on 26 November of the same year the episcopal ordination and his co-consecrators were the Archbishop of the Maronite Catholic Archeparchy of Beirut, Paul Youssef Matar and the retired bishop of the Maronite Catholic Eparchy of Our Lady of Lebanon of São Paulo, Joseph Mahfouz, OLM.

References

External links

 http://www.catholic-hierarchy.org/bishop/bnassa.html

1950 births
Lebanese Maronites
21st-century Maronite Catholic bishops
Living people